The Uruguay women's national football team represents Uruguay in international women's football.

The women's football section of the AUF started in 1996 and the first official competition of the national team took place in the 1998 South American Championship. The best performance to date in the South American Championship came in 2006 when Uruguay earned third place.

Team image

Nicknames
The Uruguay women's national football team has been known or nicknamed as the "Las Celestes" or "Charrúas".

Home stadium
Uruguay plays their home matches on the Estadio Centenario.

Results and fixtures

The following is a list of match results in the last 12 months, as well as any future matches that have been scheduled.

Legend

2022

2023

Official Uruguay Results and Fixtures – AUF.org.uy
Uruguay Results and Fixtures – Soccerway.com

Coaching staff

Current coaching staff

Manager history

Gonzalo Ribas (2003–????)
Juan José Duarte (2006–????)
Jorge Burgell (2010–????)
Fabiana Manzolillo (2014–????)
Ariel Longo (????–)

Players

Current squad

The following 23 players were named to the official squad for the 2023 Tournoi de France.

Caps and goals accurate as of the 21 February 2023 match against .

Recent call-ups
The following list of active players were not called up for the latest match of the national team, but were called up for an A-level match within the last 12 months.

 INJ = Withdrew due to injury
 PRE = Preliminary squad
 RET = Retired from the national team
 COV = COVID-19 positive test or close contact

Previous squads
FIFA Women's World Cup
2018 Copa América Femenina squad

Captains

Valeria Colmán (????–)

Records

Active players in bold, statistics correct as of 2020.

Most capped players

Top goalscorers

Honours

Continental
Copa América Femenina
  Third place: 2006

Competitive record

FIFA Women's World Cup

*Draws include knockout matches decided on penalty kicks.

Olympic Games

*Draws include knockout matches decided on penalty kicks.

CONMEBOL Copa América Femenina

*Draws include knockout matches decided on penalty kicks.

Pan American Games

*Draws include knockout matches decided on penalty kicks.

South American Games

*Draws include knockout matches decided on penalty kicks.

See also

 Sport in Uruguay
 Football in Uruguay
 Women's football in Uruguay
 Uruguay women's national football team
 Uruguay women's national football team results
 List of Uruguay women's international footballers
 Uruguay women's national under-20 football team
 Uruguay women's national under-17 football team
 Uruguay men's national football team

References

External links
Uruguay women's national football team official website at AUF.org.uy
Uruguay at FIFA.com

 
South American women's national association football teams
Women's football in Uruguay